WOWY (103.1 FM) is a classic hits radio station in State College, Pennsylvania operating with a power of 370 watts.

Programming
Until May 20, 2015, WOWY carried many nationally syndicated shows such as, Coast to Coast AM with George Noory, America in the Morning with Jim Bohannon, The Glenn Beck Program, The Dave Ramsey Show, The Sean Hannity Show, The Michael Savage Show, The Mark Levin Show, The Jerry Doyle Show, The Clark Howard Show, and Live on Sunday Night with Bill Cunningham. WOWY also aired a local show, The WRSC Morning Show, starring Centre Region-area radio veteran Kevin Nelson (& Company), which was replaced with Pat Urban show. WAPY aired NASCAR programming as well during the week from MRN Radio.

History
WOWY had been a talk radio station before becoming branded as News Radio 1390.

Andy Flick, currently a coordinating producer at CNN Radio, worked at WOWY during and after his time at Penn State University. John Lorinc, an anchor/editor for CNN Radio worked at sister station WQWK at the same time. Other WOWY alums include Pat Kain and Jennifer Goodwin.

The then-WRSC-FM moved its talk programming from 1390 AM to 103.1 FM on Monday, August 3, 2009 as "Newsradio 103 WRSC". The news/talk format moved back to 1390 AM on May 20, 2015 as 103.1 flipped to classic hits as "Happy 103.1".

It was announced on October 12, 2022 that Forever Media was selling 34 stations and 12 translators, including WAPY and five other sister stations, to State College-based Seven Mountains Media for $17.375 million. The deal closed on January 1, 2023.

On December 30, 2022, it was announced that the station would be simulcasting WOWY within days.

On January 3, 2023, WAPY picked up the WOWY classic hits format from WOWY 97.1 FM University Park, which began stunting towards a new format. WAPY changed its call sign to WOWY on January 16, 2023.

Former logos

References

External links

OWY (FM)
Classic hits radio stations in the United States
Radio stations established in 1965
1965 establishments in Pennsylvania